Eucalyptus baueriana, commonly known as blue box or round-leaved box, is a tree that is endemic to south-eastern Australia. It has rough, fibrous or flaky bark on the trunk and branches, egg-shaped adult leaves, oval to diamond-shaped flower buds arranged in groups of seven, white flowers and conical fruit.

Description
It has persistent, light grey, fibrous or flaky bark with whitish patches, on the trunk and larger branches. The higher branches have smooth, grey bark that is shed in short ribbons. Mature trees often have juvenile leaves in the crown. The leaves are the same dull or glossy green colour on both sides and sometimes have a whitish bloom. Flowering mainly occurs from September to December and the flowers are white.

Taxonomy and naming
Eucalyptus baueriana was first formally described in 1843 by Johannes Conrad Schauer and the description was published in Repertorium Botanices Systematicae. The specific epithet (baueriana) honours Ferdinand Bauer.

In 2011, Kevin James Rule described three subspecies:

Distribution and habitat
Blue box grows in woodland in near-coastal areas of New South Wales south from Putty to areas near Melbourne in Victoria although Chippendale in Flora of Australia reports the species occurring near Stanthorpe in Queensland and in the Glen Innes - Armidale area.

Subspecies deddickensis is restricted to two isolated population on the banks of the Deddick River in far north-eastern Victoria and subspecies thalassina to the Werribee River catchment near Bacchus Marsh.

References

baueriana
Myrtales of Australia
Trees of Australia
Flora of Victoria (Australia)
Flora of New South Wales
Plants described in 1843
Taxa named by Johannes Conrad Schauer